The 1952 United States Senate election in Massachusetts was held on November 4, 1952, in which Incumbent Republican Henry Cabot Lodge Jr. lost to Congressman and future President John F. Kennedy, the Democratic Party nominee. 

This election marked the end of the Lodge family dynasty and the beginning of the Kennedy family dynasty. Henry Cabot Lodge Jr., and his grandfather Henry Cabot Lodge, had held one of Massachusetts's two Senate seats for 43 of the previous 60 years. Kennedy and his younger brother Ted Kennedy would hold this Senate seat for 55 of the next 57 years.

Republican primary

Candidates
 Henry Cabot Lodge Jr., incumbent U.S. Senator

Results
Senator Lodge was unopposed for renomination.

Democratic primary

Candidates
 John F. Kennedy, U.S. Representative

Results
Representative Kennedy was unopposed for the Democratic nomination.

General election

Campaign
The 1952 Massachusetts Senate election was a contest between two representatives of New England's most prominent political families: the Republican Lodges and the Democratic Kennedys. The Lodges were a much older political dynasty; the family could trace its roots to the original Puritan pioneers who had first settled the state in the early seventeenth century. The Lodges were a "Blue blood" family, and along with several other Boston-area Protestant families, were considered to be at the apex of Massachusetts High Society, and they had been prominent in Boston political and business circles for generations. Lodge's grandfather, Henry Cabot Lodge Sr., had been a powerful United States Senator from Massachusetts, as well as a close friend and ally of President Theodore Roosevelt; he was also a foe of President Woodrow Wilson. His grandson and namesake, Henry Cabot Lodge Jr., had first been elected to the U.S. Senate in 1936, when he was the only Republican Senate candidate in the nation to defeat a Democratic incumbent. He was easily reelected in 1942. During the Second World War he resigned his Senate seat and served as a Lt. Colonel in the U.S. Army in Italy and France. In 1945 Lodge helped negotiate the surrender of German forces in western Austria. In 1946 Lodge reclaimed a Senate seat when he defeated Democratic Senator David Walsh.

Lodge's Democratic opponent in the 1952 Senate race was three-term Congressman John F. Kennedy, then only 35 years old. Although the Kennedys were a much newer political dynasty than the Lodges, they had amassed a considerably larger financial fortune, thanks in large part to the business activities of Joseph P. Kennedy Sr., Kennedy's father. The Kennedys were Irish Catholics, and in many ways the 1952 Massachusetts Senate campaign was the climax of a longstanding battle between the older Protestant families like the Lodges, who had controlled politics in the Bay State for generations, and the newer Irish Catholic families such as the Kennedys, who for demographic reasons now outnumbered the Protestants. The Kennedys also viewed the 1952 race as something of a grudge match, as Lodge's grandfather had defeated Kennedy's grandfather, Boston Mayor John F. Fitzgerald, in a 1916 Senate race in Massachusetts.

Congressman Kennedy's Senate campaign was managed by his younger brother Robert F. Kennedy, who would perform the same function for his brother in the 1960 presidential campaign. Kennedy launched his campaign early in 1952 and made an intensive effort, by election day in November 1952 he had visited every city, town, and village in Massachusetts at least once. He also collected a record number of signatures for his petition for office, assembling a petition of over a quarter-million signatures. Many of those who signed the petition would later become campaign volunteers or workers for Kennedy in their hometowns. A famous innovation by the Kennedys in the 1952 Senate race were a series of "tea parties" sponsored by Kennedy's mother and sisters in the fall. Congressman Kennedy attended each of the tea parties and shook hands and charmed the voters (usually female) who were present; it is estimated that a total of 70,000 voters attended the tea parties, which was roughly his margin of victory over Lodge.

Lodge, meanwhile, neglected his Senate campaign for most of 1952. Instead, he focused on persuading Dwight D. Eisenhower, the popular World War II general, to run for and win the Republican presidential nomination over Ohio Senator Robert A. Taft, the leader of the party's conservatives. Lodge, a moderate and internationalist, strongly disagreed with Taft's isolationist foreign-policy views and felt that Taft could not win a presidential election. Lodge served as Eisenhower's campaign manager and played a key role in helping Eisenhower to beat Taft and win the Republican nomination. However, Lodge's prominent role in defeating Taft angered many of Taft's supporters in Massachusetts, and they vowed revenge. Congressman Kennedy privately courted many of Taft's more prominent backers in Massachusetts, and some of them, such as Basil Brewer, the publisher of the New Bedford Standard-Times, supported Kennedy over Lodge in their newspapers and editorials.

When the usually Democratic-leaning but financially unstable Boston Post planned to endorse Lodge, Joseph Kennedy arranged for a $500,000 loan so the paper would endorse his son; John Kennedy stated that "we had to buy that fucking paper or I'd have been licked." Kennedy and Lodge engaged in one public debate, which was held on radio; the debate was generally considered a draw, although some observers felt that Kennedy's ability to hold his own with the older and more distinguished Lodge gave him the advantage. The nationally-known and Catholic Senator Joseph McCarthy of Wisconsin refused to campaign for Lodge, a fellow Republican, due to his friendship with the Kennedy family. McCarthy was popular among many Catholic voters in Massachusetts due to his Communist-hunting activities in Congress; William F. Buckley Jr. believed that Lodge probably would have won the election with McCarthy's help.

On the weekend before the election Eisenhower visited Boston and energetically campaigned for Lodge, but it was not enough. Although Eisenhower carried Massachusetts by over 200,000 votes, Kennedy narrowly upset Lodge, winning by 70,000 votes and three percentage points.

Results

Source: OurCampaigns.com

Aftermath
Kennedy's narrow victory marked the end of the Lodge dynasty and beginning of the Kennedy dynasty. Since January 1953, the Lodge name has faded from Massachusetts office, and the family has largely retired from state politics. Lodge's son George C. Lodge lost the 1962 Massachusetts Senate special election to Ted Kennedy, the last time that the two families opposed one another in a political campaign.

Conversely, the Kennedy family controlled the Senate seat they won in 1952 from January 1953 until Ted Kennedy's death in August 2009, as John Kennedy, family friend Benjamin A. Smith II, and then Ted Kennedy each held the seat. Lodge served for eight years as President Eisenhower's United Nations Ambassador. In the 1960 presidential election, he was Richard Nixon's running mate, but the Democratic ticket of Senators Kennedy and Lyndon B. Johnson won the election.

See also 
 1952 United States Senate elections

Sources
Whalen, Thomas J. (2000). Kennedy versus Lodge: The 1952 Massachusetts Senate Race. Boston, Mass.: Northeastern University Press. .

References

1952
Massachusetts
1952 Massachusetts elections
John F. Kennedy